Heidelberg Township is a township in Lehigh County, Pennsylvania. The population of Heidelberg Township was 3,416 at the 2010 census. It is a suburb of Allentown in the Lehigh Valley, which had a population of 861,899 and was the 68th most populous metropolitan area in the U.S. as of the 2020 census.

Geography
The township is in northern Lehigh County. Its villages include Diebertsville, Germans Corners, Germansville (both pronounced with a hard "g",) Jordan Valley, Lochland (also in Lynn Township), Pleasant Corners, and Saegersville.

The township is located in the Delaware River watershed. Almost all of it drains into the Lehigh River (mainly by Jordan Creek which starts in Heidelberg), except for a very small area in the southwest portion that is drained by tributaries of Ontelaunee Creek leading to the Schuylkill River.

Adjacent municipalities
Washington Township (east)
North Whitehall Township (southeast)
Lowhill Township (south)
Weisenberg Township (tangent to the southwest)
Lynn Township (west)
West Penn Township (tangent to the northwest)
East Penn Township (north)

Climate
The township has a humid continental climate (Dfa/Dfb) and the hardiness zones are 6a and 6b.

Transportation

Numbered routes in Heidelberg Township are Pennsylvania Route 100 and Pennsylvania Route 309. PA 100's northern terminus is on PA 309 in Pleasant Corners.

Demographics

As of the census of 2000, there were 3,279 people, 1,187 households, and 943 families residing in the township.  The population density was 132.7 people per square mile (51.3/km).  There were 1,234 housing units at an average density of 50.0/sq mi (19.3/km).  The racial makeup of the township was 98.69% White, 0.27% African American, 0.06% Native American, 0.30% Asian, 0.21% from other races, and 0.46% from two or more races. Hispanic or Latino of any race were 0.88% of the population.

There were 1,187 households, out of which 38.6% had children under the age of 18 living with them, 67.9% were married couples living together, 7.6% had a female householder with no husband present, and 20.5% were non-families. 15.2% of all households were made up of individuals, and 4.9% had someone living alone who was 65 years of age or older.  The average household size was 2.76 and the average family size was 3.08.

In the township, the population was spread out, with 26.5% under the age of 18, 6.5% from 18 to 24, 32.0% from 25 to 44, 26.4% from 45 to 64, and 8.7% who were 65 years of age or older.  The median age was 37 years. For every 100 females, there were 104.0 males.  For every 100 females age 18 and over, there were 99.9 males. The median income for a household in the township was $55,030, and the median income for a family was $57,019. Males had a median income of $40,062 versus $29,205 for females. The per capita income for the township was $23,521.  About 7.0% of families and 6.5% of the population were below the poverty line, including 6.2% of those under age 18 and 6.9% of those age 65 or over.

Public education
The township is served by the Northwestern Lehigh School District.

References

External links

Bake Oven Knob information

Townships in Lehigh County, Pennsylvania
Townships in Pennsylvania